Matías Leonel González (born 3 January 1997) is an Argentine professional footballer who plays as a forward for Peña Boquense.

Career
González started his footballing career with Lanús. During the 2015 Argentine Primera División season, he appeared on the club's substitutes bench for games against Temperley and Atlético de Rafaela but was unused both times. In August 2016, González joined Primera B Nacional side Chacarita Juniors on loan. He made his debut on 27 August in a 1–1 draw versus Instituto. Overall, he made seventeen appearances in league and cup as Chacarita won promotion to the Argentine Primera División. González was loaned to Los Andes on 22 February 2018.

Career statistics
.

References

External links

1997 births
Living people
People from Ezeiza, Buenos Aires
Argentine footballers
Association football forwards
Argentine Primera División players
Primera Nacional players
Club Atlético Lanús footballers
Chacarita Juniors footballers
Club Atlético Los Andes footballers
Sportspeople from Buenos Aires Province